John Christopher "Chris" Turner (born 1947) is an American citizen who is notable for his activities in Afghanistan.

Biography
During the Soviet–Afghan War, Turner is reported to have served with the anti-Soviet Afghan Mujahideen.
Turner is reported to have uploaded a YouTube video where he describes meeting Osama bin Laden, in 1984, when both men were foreign volunteers, helping to fight Afghanistan's Soviet occupiers.

Turner speaks Pashtun and wears a turban and a beard.

On October 28, 2009, while Turner was working for an Afghan trucking firm, he was staying at the Bakhtar guest house when it was attacked by a suicide attack from a band of Taliban.
Turner described hearing the initial gunfire from the 6am attack, grabbing his AK-47, and waking as many of the other guests as he could, guiding them to the guest house's laundry room, and helping them escape.  He said that he and a Nepalese man had held off the attackers while the guests he had roused escaped.  Five guests, three attackers, and two of the guest house guards died during the attack.

References

Osama bin Laden
Living people
People of the Soviet–Afghan War
1947 births